Ahmed Haggag (born May 1, 1987) is an Egyptian professional footballer who plays as a centre-forward for the Egyptian club El Raja SC.

Haggag had a car accident in July 2017.

References

External links
 Ahmed Haggag at KOOORA.com

1987 births
Living people
Egyptian footballers
Association football forwards
Al Mokawloon Al Arab SC players
Ghazl El Mahalla SC players
Olympic Club (Egypt) players
Tala'ea El Gaish SC players
Haras El Hodoud SC players
El Raja SC players
Egyptian Premier League players